Rayane Bouhanni (born 24 February 1996 in Épinal) is a French cyclist, who last rode for UCI Professional Continental team . He is the younger brother of Nacer Bouhanni.

Major results

2014
 National Junior Road Championships
1st  Road race
2nd Time trial
 1st  Overall Tour de l'Abitibi
1st Stage 1
 3rd Overall Grand Prix Rüebliland
 UEC European Junior Road Championships
9th Road race
9th Time trial

References

External links
 
 
 

1996 births
Living people
Sportspeople from Épinal
French male cyclists
Cyclists from Grand Est
French sportspeople of Algerian descent
20th-century French people
21st-century French people